Luis Silvio Rojas Álvarez (born 5 April 1954) is a Chilean footballer. He played in 17 matches for the Chile national football team from 1980 to 1985. He was also part of Chile's squad for the 1983 Copa América tournament.

References

External links
 

1954 births
Living people
Chilean footballers
Chile international footballers
Place of birth missing (living people)
Association football midfielders
Magallanes managers